The men's singles event at the 2003 Pan American Games was held at Centro Nacional de Tenis in Santo Domingo from August 4 to August 10.

Fernando Meligeni won the gold medal by defeating Marcelo Ríos in the final, 5–7, 7–6(8–6), 7–6(7–5). It was the final match of Meligeni's career. The Bronze medal was awarded to both semifinalists.

Medalists

Seeds

Draw

Finals

Top half

Section 1

Section 2

Bottom half

Section 3

Section 4

References

Draw constructed from daily results taken from 2003 Pan Archive UOL.

 
 
 
 
 
 
 

2003 in tennis
Men's Singles